Peter Feldman is a professional poker player from Harper Woods, Michigan

Feldmans's first major success in poker came in a 2006 World Series of Poker circuit event, where he won the tournament and $532,950. Since then, Feldman has cashed in some World Poker Tour events and in the 2006 and 2007 World Series of Poker Main Event. As of 2008, he ranks second in World Series of Poker Circuit event earnings, having cashed for a total of $830,028.

As of 2008, his total live tournament winnings exceed $1,100,000.

He was indicted by the FBI in 2013 for racketeering.

References

American poker players
People from Harper Woods, Michigan
Living people
World Series of Poker Circuit event winners
Year of birth missing (living people)